Jiang Feng (1910–1983) was a Chinese artist known for incorporating politics into his artwork, and using woodcut as his form of media. He was a member of the Communist Party.

Early life

Jiang Feng was born in Shanghai. His original name was Zhou Xi(周熙). Jiang grew up in a working class family. As a teenager, he became involved in left-wing politics, mainly because he worked as a bookkeeper for a railroad company and participated in labor strike activities.

At the age of nineteen, Jiang began taking classes at the White Swan Western Painting Club in Shanghai.

Left-Wing Activity

In 1931, Jiang joined a group of protesting students and launched the Shanghai Eighteen Art Society Research Center. The group got its name from the year it began forming, 1929- the 18th year of the republic. The group published and spread anti-imperialist propaganda among Chinese workers.

He participated in founding Lu Xun's Creative Print Movement. Lu supplied the Eighteen Art Society with funds, woodcuts, and books. He put Jiang and the members of the "Eighteen Art Society in charge of selecting students for the workshop on woodcut technique in 1931 that Lu Xun organized in Shanghai."

In 1932, Jiang officially became a part of the Communist Party. Soon after he was elected executive of the League of Left-Wing Artists.

On numerous occasions, Jiang Feng was arrested. Shortly after Jiang joined the Communist Party, he was arrested along with eleven other members of the Eighteen Art Society by the Nationalist Government. He spent two years in prison. During this time he led hunger strikes and organized a school. In 1933, two months after his release, Jiang was rearrested, and spent another two years in jail. In the wake of Mao Zedong's Rectification Campaign in 1942 Jiang was arrested again for unknown reasons.

After his second release from prison, he returned to Shanghai in 1935. There, he continued his political activity. Jiang worked for a publication titled Iron Horse Press. He produced several woodcuts inspired by Soviet Constructivism for them.

When the Japanese attacked Shanghai in 1937, Jiang fled to the Chinese Workers' and Peasants' Red Army in Yan'an.

Career

In 1939, Jiang Feng was an instructor at Lu Xun Academy of Literature and Art in Yan'an. He was made director of the art department the following year. In this particular position, he was in charge of the art factory responsible for producing nianhua prints for Red Army propaganda.

"Between 1945 and 1949, Jiang dedicated his work to the war of liberation against the nationalists."

Jiang Feng held many different positions at various institutes.

In 1946 he was the Head of the Art Department at Huabei United Revolutionary University. In 1949 he was the Vice-Chairman of Chinese Artists' Association under Maoist regime. He also held the titles of Deputy Director, then Director of Chinese Artists' Association. From 1949 through 1957 Feng was the leading figure in Mao's project of cultural reform in the art world.

Jiang was the Vice President of Zhejiang Academy of Fine Arts in Hangzhou. He was also the President of the prestigious Central Academy of Fine Arts in Beijing.

In July 1949, Jiang was elected to the National Committee of All-China Literary and Arts Circles.

He was made an Honorary Chairman of Chinese Print Media Artists Association.

In 1979, after the Cultural Revolution ended, Jiang was honored with Presidency of the Chinese Artists' Association.

Teachings

While working at these academies, Jiang taught using two concepts of art: Yan'an conception of art education and the Russian system of art education. 
The Yan'an conception of art education required students to learn Marxist and Mao Zedong thought. Students also had to devote a significant amount of time to working with peasants, workers, and soldiers. 
The Russian system of art education emphasized drawing from life and from plaster casts of sculpture, and acquiring the skills needed to paint with oils and watercolors.

Because Jiang was dedicated to the medium of printmaking, this was eventually granted independent department status within schools.

Artwork

Much of Jiang Feng's artwork incorporated styles from other countries. In 1931 he produced a woodcut titled, "Kill the Resisters." It is in the stark style of German Expressionism. The painting depicts a group of flag-warning demonstrators fleeing from the gunfire of armed Nationalist troops.

In 1942 Jiang created, "Studying is Good," which was a mix of nianhua prints and positive Communist content. It conveyed two children holding up a writing brush and abacus, while squash and grain are growing at their feet. The slogan above their heads reads, "Studying is good. After you study you can do accounts and write letters."

Jiang also published papers on art: "Art of Italian Renaissance," "Appreciation of Western Famous Paintings," and "Art of DaVinci."

References

Further reading
Andrews, Julia F. Painters and Politics in the People's Republic of China, 1949-1979. Berkeley: University of California Press, 1994. 
Andrews, Julia., and Kuiyi Shen. A Century in Crisis: Modernity and Tradition in the Art of Twentieth-Century China. Exhibition catalogue. New York: Guggenheim Museum, 1998. 
Andrews, Julia F., Claudia Brown, David E. Fraser, and Kiuyi Shen. Between the Thunder and the Rain: Chinese Paintings from the Opium War through the Cultural Revolution 1840-1979. Exhibition catalogue. San Francisco, CA: Echo Rock Ventures, 2000. 
Hung, Chang-Tai. War and Popular culture: Resistance in Modern China, 1937-1945. Berkeley: University of California Press, 1994. 
Kao, Mayching, ed. Twentieth-Century Chinese Painting. Oxford: Oxford University Press, 1988. 
Rotondo, Lisa. Chinese Revolutionary Woodcuts, 1935-1948. Exhibition catalogue. Hamilton, NY: The Picker Art Gallery, Colgate University, 1984. 
Sullivan, Michael. Art and Artists of Twentieth-Century China. Berkeley: University of California Press, 1996. 
Wachs, Iris, and Chang Tsong-zung. Half a Century of Chinese Woodblock Prints: From the Communist Revolution to the Open-Door Policy and Beyond, 1945-1998. Exhibition catalogue. Ein Harod, Israel: The Museum of Art Ein Harod, 1999.

Artists from Shanghai
1910 births
1983 deaths
Presidents of Central Academy of Fine Arts
Victims of the Anti-Rightist Campaign
Chinese art educators